Duttabarutia is a village in Bharatpur II CD Block in Kandi subdivision Murshidabad district in West Bengal, India.

Demographics
As per the 2011 Census of India, Duttabarutia had a total population of 3,282, of which 1,679 (51%) were males and 1,603 (49%) were females. Population below 6 years was 368. The total number of literates was 1,843 (63.25% of the population over 6 years).

Education
There are two primary schools. One is situated at the center of the village named Duttabarutia 1 No  Primary School and the other is in the west of the village named Duttabarutia 2 No Primary School.

Culture
There are two famous temples named after Lord Shiva (Raghaveswar) and Goddess Kali in the village. No separate idol of Kali is worshiped during Kali Puja. The reason for this is not clearly known. However, people think that the existing famous Kali temple might be the reason.

Healthcare
There is a Primary Health Centre, with 6 beds, at Duttabarutia.

Sports
There is a Big Play Ground at the entrance of the village.

References

Villages in Murshidabad district